KVNN (1340 AM, Victoria News Network) is a radio station broadcasting a News Talk Information format. Licensed to Victoria, Texas, United States, the station serves the Victoria, TX area.  The station is currently owned by Victoria Radio Works, Ltd. and features programming from Citadel Broadcasting, Premiere Radio Networks and USA Radio Network.

History
The station signed on the air in Victoria on December 28, 1961 as KVIC. It was assigned the call letters KCWM on January 12, 1981. On June 6, 1985, the station changed its call sign to KAMG, on March 9, 2001 to KRNX, and on March 9, 2004 to the current KVNN,

References

External links

VNN